The 1874 transit of Venus, which took place on 9 December 1874 (01:49 to 06:26 UTC), was the first of the pair of transits of Venus that took place in the 19th century, with the second transit occurring eight years later in 1882. The previous pair of transits had taken place in 1761 and 1769, and the next pair would not take place until 2004 and 2012. As with previous transits, the 1874 transit would provide an opportunity for improved measurements and observations. Numerous expeditions were planned and sent out to observe the transit from locations around the globe, with several countries setting up official committees to organise the planning.

There were six official French expeditions. One expedition went to New Zealand's Campbell Island, the other five travelling to Île Saint-Paul in the Indian Ocean, Nouméa in New Caledonia in the Pacific, Nagasaki in Japan (with an auxiliary station in Kobe), Peking in China, and Saigon in Vietnam.

There were five official British expeditions or observation sites. One expedition travelled to Hawaii, with two others sent to the Kerguelen Archipelago in the far southern reaches of the Indian Ocean, and Rodrigues, an island further north in the Indian Ocean, near Mauritius. A fourth expedition went to a site near Cairo in Egypt, and the fifth travelled to a site near Christchurch (now Burnham Military Camp) in New Zealand. Several of the expeditions included auxiliary observation stations that were constructed in addition to the main observation sites.

In the United States, the Transit of Venus Commission sent out eight expeditions funded by Congress, one to Kerguelen, one to Hobart, Tasmania, one to Queenstown, New Zealand, one to Chatham Island in the southern Pacific, one led by James Craig Watson in Peking, one to Nagasaki in Japan, and one to Vladivostok in Russia. The eighth expedition had been intended for Crozet Island, but was unable to land there and instead made observations from Tasmania. These expeditions obtained 350 photographic plates for the 1874 transit.

The transit was observed from many observatories, including the Melbourne Observatory, Adelaide Observatory and Sydney Observatory in Australia, the Royal Observatory at Cape Town in what is now South Africa, the Royal Alfred Observatory on Mauritius, the Madras Observatory in Madras, India, the Colonial Time Service Observatory in Wellington, New Zealand, and the Khedivial Observatory in Egypt. The Sydney Observatory sent an observing party to Goulburn in Australia.

Italian astronomer Pietro Tacchini led an expedition to Muddapur, India. Other locations in India from where the transit was observed included Roorkee, and Visakhapatnam. The German astronomer Hugo von Seeliger directed an expedition that travelled to the Auckland Islands (subantarctic New Zealand islands). German astronomers also travelled to Isfahan in Persia, and to Kerguelen. The Dutch astronomer Jean Abraham Chrétien Oudemans made observations from Réunion, and observations were also made from various points in the Dutch East Indies. Austrian astronomers made observations from Jassy, in what is now Romania. The Russian astronomer Otto Wilhelm von Struve organised expeditions to make observations in eastern Asia, the Caucasus, Persia and Egypt. Two Mexican expeditions travelled to Yokohama in Japan.

There were also several individuals that journeyed to various locations to observe the transit, or funded private expeditions. Archibald Campbell made observations from Thebes in Egypt. James Ludovic Lindsay funded a private expedition to Mauritius. Several private or amateur observations were known to have been made from New South Wales, including from Eden, Windsor, and Sydney. A privately funded expedition from the USA also travelled to Beechworth, Victoria, in Australia.

Not all the observers were able to make measurements, either due to adverse weather conditions, or problems with the equipment used. Many observers, particularly those on the official expeditions, used the new technique of photoheliography, intending to use the photographic plates to make precise measurements. However, the results of using this new technique were poor, and several expeditions were unable to produce publishable results or improve on existing values for the astronomical unit (AU). In addition to this, observations made of Mars were producing more accurate results for calculating the value of the AU than could be obtained during a transit of Venus.

See also
 Passage de Venus A series of photographs taken of the transit by Pierre Janssen, listed by IMDb as the first film

Notes

References

External links

General
1874 Transit of Venus (The Royal Society)
Listing of articles on the 1874 transit (transitofvenus.nl blog)
Specific
Mexico’s international scientific expedition to observe the 1874 transit of Venus (Geo-Mexico)
The National Academy of Sciences’ Committee on the Transit of Venus, 1871 and 1881 (The US National Academies)
'The American transit of Venus expeditions of 1874 and 1882' (Steven J. Dick, 2004), published in Transits of Venus: New Views of the Solar System and Galaxy, Proceedings IAU Colloquium No. 196, 2004, D.W. Kurtz, ed.
Contemporary published accounts
Account of observations of the transit of Venus, 1874, December 8 (1881) – the official account of the five British expeditions, edited by George Biddell Airy
Transit of Venus 1874 (1892) – account of Australian observations written by Henry Chamberlain Russell

1874 in science
Transit of Venus
December 1874 events